The Tasman Region's Clarke River is one of three rivers by that name in the South Island of New Zealand.

References
 New Zealand 1:50,000 Topographic Map Series sheet BQ24 - Tapawera
 Land Information New Zealand topographic names database

Rivers of the Tasman District
Kahurangi National Park
Rivers of New Zealand